William VII of Montpellier was the eldest son of William VI and of his wife Sibylle.

Aged around 15, he inherited the lordship of Montpellier from his father in 1146 under the tutelage of his grandmother, Ermessende of Melgueil. In 1156 he married Matilda of Burgundy, daughter of Hugh II, Duke of Burgundy.

He fell ill in 1171 and made his will on St Michael's day (29 September 1171), appointing his brother Gui Guerrejat and John of Montlaur, bishop of Maguelonne, as joint guardians of his young sons. He probably died in 1172.

He and Matilda had nine children:
Sibylle, who married Rayomond Gaucelm of Lunel
William VIII of Montpellier
another William, who died between 1171 and 1180
Gui, named Gui Burgundion after his mother and to distinguish him from his uncle Gui Guerrejat. He married Azalais of Conas and had a daughter, Burgundione. He founded the order of the Holy Ghost
Raymond, who became a Cistercian monk at Grandselve, then bishop of Lodève, then (by 1192) bishop of Agde
Guillemette, who married Raymond of Anduze, son of Bernard V of Anduze
Azalais or Adelaide
Marie
Clémence, who was for some time a nun, but in 1199 married Rostaing of Sabran, constable of the count of Toulouse

Lords of Montpellier
Guilhem dynasty
1172 deaths
Year of birth unknown